The Mausoleum of Saladin holds the resting place and grave of the medieval Muslim Ayyubid Sultan Saladin. It is adjacent to the Umayyad Mosque in Damascus, Syria. It was built in 1196, three years after the death of Saladin. In addition to the tomb, the tomb complex included Madrassah al-Aziziah, of which little remains, except a few columns and an internal arch adjacent to the renovated tomb.

The mausoleum presently houses two sarcophagi: one made of wood, said to contain Saladin's remains, and one made of marble, was built in homage to Saladin in late nineteenth century by Ottoman Sultan Abdulhamid II and was later restored by German emperor Wilhelm II. Along with a marble sarcophagus, a golden ornate gilt bronze wreath was also put on the marble sarcophagus, which was later removed by either Faisal I or Lawrence of Arabia, who later deposited it in the Imperial War Museum.

Gallery

References

Bibliography

Buildings and structures completed in 1196
Mausoleums in Syria
Ayyubid architecture in Syria
Buildings and structures inside the walled city of Damascus
Saladin